Twelve O'Clock High is a 1949 American war film about aircrews in the United States Army's Eighth Air Force, who flew daylight bombing missions against Germany and Occupied France during the early days of American involvement in World War II. The climax includes a thinly disguised version of the Black Thursday strike against Schweinfurt.

The film was adapted by Sy Bartlett and Beirne Lay, Jr., with uncredited contributions by director Henry King, from the 1948 novel 12 O'Clock High by Bartlett and Lay. It stars Gregory Peck, Hugh Marlowe, Gary Merrill, Millard Mitchell, and Dean Jagger.

The film was nominated for four Academy Awards and won two: Dean Jagger for Best Actor in a Supporting Role, and Thomas T. Moulton for Best Sound Recording. In 1998, Twelve O'Clock High was selected for preservation in the United States National Film Registry by the Library of Congress as being "culturally, historically, or aesthetically significant".

Plot

In 1949, former United States Army Air Forces officer Harvey Stovall spots a familiar Toby Jug in the window of a London antique shop and learns that it came from Archbury, an airfield where Stovall served during World War II. Convinced that it is the same jug which used to stand on the mantel of the airfield's officers' club, he buys it and journeys to the derelict airfield, where he reflects on his wartime experiences.

In a flashback, the setting shifts to 1942, when the 918th Bomb Group at Archbury has gained a reputation as the "hard luck group". After a particularly disastrous mission, group commander Colonel Keith Davenport appears exhausted and demoralized. His defeatist attitude spreads to other senior leaders of the group, including his Air Exec, Lieutenant Colonel Ben Gately. Ordered to fly another mission the next day, at a dangerously low altitude, Davenport protests to his friend, Brigadier General Frank Savage, the Assistant Chief of Staff for Operations at VIII Bomber Command. Later, Savage reluctantly shares with Major General Pritchard, the commanding general of VIII Bomber Command, his belief that Davenport has become emotionally too close to his men and may no longer be fit to command. That night, Pritchard and Savage visit the group headquarters to investigate the cause of the mission's heavy losses. Pritchard realizes that Savage is right: Davenport has become over-protective and is unwilling to discipline his men, even for costly mistakes. Davenport is relieved of command and Savage is asked to take over.

Savage takes a harsh approach to restoring the group's discipline and morale. He begins by reprimanding Gately, demoting him to aircraft commander and insisting that he henceforth fly every mission. Savage assigns Gately only the most incompetent crewmen, ordering him to paint the name "Leper Colony" on his airplane. Rough-and-ready Major Cobb impresses Savage with his independent spirit and replaces Gately as Air Exec. Savage conducts a series of training missions and waits for an opportunity to restore the group's pride in its abilities. Upset by the contrast of Savage's stern leadership with Davenport's easygoing ways, all of the group's pilots apply for transfers. Savage asks the Group Adjutant, Major Stovall, to delay processing their applications to buy him some time. An attorney in civilian life, Stovall knows how to use bureaucratic red tape to his advantage.

When the group returns to combat, all the groups are ordered to abort their mission due to heavy weather. Savage ignores the recall order. The 918th successfully bombs the target and is the only group to do so. All of its crews return safely. Though Pritchard is furious, Savage claims that he did not hear the recall due to a radio malfunction and instead persuades Pritchard to recommend the group for a Distinguished Unit Citation. Savage also acquires a surrogate son in Lieutenant Jesse Bishop, a Medal of Honor recipient who is Savage's eyes and ears among the combat aircrews.
When the Inspector General arrives to investigate the pilots' transfer requests, Savage packs his belongings, expecting to be relieved of command and possibly court-martialed. But, led by Bishop, the pilots withdraw their requests. Savage also softens his attitude towards the men as he becomes more closely involved with them. Gately goes on to win Savage's respect and admiration by demonstrating extraordinary leadership and courage in combat.

With enemy resistance intensifying as the air war advances deeper into Germany, missions become longer and riskier and many of Savage's best men are shot down or killed. Pritchard tries to get Savage to return to a staff job at VIII Bomber Command, but Savage feels that the 918th is not yet ready to do without him. Reluctantly, Pritchard leaves him in command. Ordered to return to the same target after a particularly brutal raid on a ball bearing factory, Savage finds himself physically unable to haul himself up into his B-17. Gately takes his place as lead pilot and strike commander for the mission. While waiting for the group's return, Savage becomes catatonic. Only as they return to Archbury does he regain his composure and fall asleep.

The story then returns to 1949, as Stovall pedals away from Archbury.

Cast

 Gregory Peck as General Savage
 Hugh Marlowe as Lt. Col. Ben Gately
 Gary Merrill as Col. Davenport
 Millard Mitchell as General Pritchard
 Dean Jagger as Major Stovall
 Robert Arthur as Sgt. McIllhenny
 Paul Stewart as Capt. "Doc" Kaiser
 John Kellogg as Major Cobb
 Robert Patten as Lt. Bishop (credited as Bob Patten)
 Lee MacGregor as Lt. Zimmerman
 Sam Edwards as Birdwell
 Roger Anderson as Interrogation Officer
 Kenneth Tobey as Guard Post Sergeant (uncredited)

Historical counterparts of characters
The character Brigadier General Frank Savage was a composite of several group commanders, but the primary inspiration was Colonel Frank A. Armstrong, who commanded the 306th Bomb Group on which the 918th was modeled. The name "Savage" was inspired by Armstrong's Cherokee heritage. While his work with the 306th, which lasted only six weeks, consisted primarily of rebuilding the chain of command within the group, Armstrong had earlier performed a similar task with the 97th Bomb Group. Many of the training and disciplinary scenes in Twelve O'Clock High derive from that experience.

Towards the end of the film, the near-catatonic battle fatigue that General Savage suffered and the harrowing missions that led up to it were inspired by the experiences of Brigadier General Newton Longfellow. The symptoms of the breakdown were not based on any real-life event, but instead were intended to portray the effects of intense stress experienced by many airmen.

Lieutenant General Pritchard was modeled on the VIII Bomber Command's first commander, Major General Ira C. Eaker.

Colonel Keith Davenport was based on the first commander of the 306th Bomb Group, Colonel Charles B. Overacker, nicknamed "Chip". Of all the personalities portrayed in Twelve O'Clock High, that of Colonel Davenport most closely parallels his true-life counterpart. The early scene in which Davenport confronts Savage about a mission order was a close recreation of an actual event, as was his relief.

Major (later Lieutenant Colonel) Harvey Stovall, who is a former World War I U.S. Army Air Service pilot who has returned to active duty as a nonflying adjutant, was modeled on William Howard Stovall, a World War I flying ace who returned to active duty as a major in the USAAF the week following Pearl Harbor, and served as the nonflying deputy chief of staff for personnel for the 8th Air Force in England for his World War I comrades, Brigadier General Frank O'Driscoll Hunter and General Carl Spaatz.

Second Lieutenant Jesse Bishop (played by Robert Patten), who belly-lands in the B-17 next to the runway at the beginning of the film and was nominated for the Medal of Honor, had his true-life counterpart in Second Lieutenant John C. Morgan. The description of Bishop's fight to control the bomber after his pilot was hit in the head by fragments of a 20 mm cannon shell is taken almost verbatim from Morgan's Medal of Honor citation. Details may be found in The 12 O'Clock High Logbook. Patten had been a USAAF navigator in World War II, the only member of the cast with aircrew experience.

Sergeant McIllhenny was drawn from a member of the 306th Bomb Group, Sgt Donald Bevan, a qualified gunner who was assigned ground jobs, including part-time driver for the commander of his squadron. Bevan had received publicity as a stowaway gunner (similar to McIllhenny in the film), though in reality, he had been invited to fly missions. Like McIllhenny, he proved to be a "born gunner".

The "tough guy" character Major Joe Cobb was inspired by Colonel Paul Tibbets, who had flown B-17s with Colonel Armstrong. Tibbets was initially approved as the film's technical advisor in February 1949, but was replaced shortly after by Colonel John H. de Russy, a former operations officer for the 305th Bomb Group.

Production

According to their files, 20th Century Fox paid $100,000 outright for the rights to the unfinished book, plus up to $100,000 more in escalator and book-club clauses. Darryl Zanuck was apparently convinced to pay this high price when he heard that William Wyler was interested in purchasing it for Paramount. Even then, Zanuck only went through with the deal in October 1947 when he was certain that the United States Air Force would support the production. The film made use of actual combat footage during the battle scenes, including some shot by the Luftwaffe. A good deal of the production was filmed on Eglin Air Force Base and its associated auxiliary fields near Fort Walton, Florida.

Source material
Screenwriters Bartlett and Lay drew on their own wartime experiences with Eighth Air Force bomber units. At the Eighth Air Force headquarters, Bartlett had worked closely with Colonel Armstrong, who was the primary model for the character General Savage. The film's 918th Bomber Group was modeled primarily on the 306th because that group remained a significant part of the Eighth Air Force throughout the war in Europe.

Casting
Clark Gable was interested in the lead role of General Frank Savage. Gable, who had served in the USAAF during World War II, played a similar role in the 1948 film Command Decision. John Wayne was offered the leading role, as well, but turned it down. Burt Lancaster, James Cagney, Dana Andrews, Van Heflin, Edmond O'Brien, Ralph Bellamy, Robert Preston, Robert Young, and Robert Montgomery were also considered for the role. Eventually, the role went to Gregory Peck, who initially turned it down because the script was similar to Command Decision.  Peck changed his mind because he was impressed with director Henry King, finding his empathy with the material and the cast and crew appealing. The two made more films together: The Gunfighter (1950), David and Bathsheba (1952), The Bravados (1958), and Beloved Infidel (1959).

Filming
Veterans of the heavy bomber campaign frequently cite Twelve O'Clock High as the only Hollywood film that accurately captured their combat experiences. Along with the 1948 film Command Decision, it marked a turning away from the optimistic, morale-boosting style of wartime films and toward a grittier realism that deals more directly with the human costs of war. Both films deal with the realities of daylight precision bombing without fighter escort, the basic USAAF doctrine at the start of World War II (prior to the arrival of long-range Allied fighter aircraft such as the P-51 Mustang). As producers, writers Lay and Bartlett reused major plot elements of Twelve O'Clock High in later films featuring the U.S. Air Force, the 1950s-era Toward the Unknown and the early 1960s Cold War-era A Gathering of Eagles.

Paul Mantz, Hollywood's leading stunt pilot, was paid the then-unprecedented sum of $4,500 to crash-land a B-17 bomber for one early scene in the film. Frank Tallman, Mantz' partner in Tallmantz Aviation, wrote in his autobiography that while many B-17s had been landed by one pilot, as far as he knew, this flight was the first time that a B-17 ever took off with only one pilot and no other crew; nobody was sure that it could be done. " The footage was used again in the 1962 film The War Lover.

Locations for creating the bomber airfield at the fictional RAF Archbury were scouted by director Henry King, flying his own Beech Bonanza some 16,000 miles in February and March 1949. King visited Eglin AFB on March 8, 1949, and found an ideal location for principal photography several miles north of the main base at its Eglin AFB Auxiliary Field No. 3, better known as Duke Field, where the mock installation with 15 buildings (including a World War II control tower) were constructed to simulate RAF Archbury. The film's technical advisor, Colonel John de Russy, was stationed at Maxwell Air Force Base, Alabama, at the time, and suggested Ozark Army Air Field near Daleville, Alabama (now known as Cairns Army Airfield, adjacent to Fort Rucker). King chose Cairns as the location for filming B-17 takeoffs and landings, including the B-17 belly landing sequence, since the light-colored runways at Eglin did not match wartime runways in England, which had been black to make them less visible to enemy aircraft. When the crew arrived at Cairns, it was also considered as "ideal for shots of Harvey Stovall reminiscing about his World War II service", since the field was somewhat overgrown. The opening and closing scenes of the derelict RAF Archbury, referencing themes in the film, have a very similar approach to the opening scenes of the derelict fictional RAF Halfpenny Field in the earlier 1945 film The Way to the Stars.

Additional background photography was shot at RAF Barford St John, a satellite station of RAF Croughton in Oxfordshire, England. Officially, the airfield is still under Ministry of Defence ownership following its closure in the late 1990s as a communications station linked to the since-closed RAF Upper Heyford. Other locations around Eglin AFB and Fort Walton also served as secondary locations for filming. The crew used 12 B-17s for filming, which were pulled from QB-17 drones used at Eglin and other B-17s from depot locations in Alabama and New Mexico. Since some of the aircraft had been used in the 1946 Bikini atomic experiments and absorbed high levels of radioactivity, they could only be used for shooting for limited periods.

Twelve O'Clock High was in production from late April to early July 1949. Although originally planned to be shot in Technicolor, it was instead shot in black and white, allowing the inclusion of actual combat footage by Allied and Luftwaffe cameras.

Reception
Twelve O'Clock High premiered in Los Angeles on December 21, 1949, and opened in New York City on January 26, 1950.  It went into general release in February 1950. An influential review by Bosley Crowther of The New York Times was indicative of many contemporary reviews. He noted that the film focused more on the human element than the aircraft or machinery of war. The Times picked Twelve O'Clock High as one of the 10 Best Films of 1949 and, in later years, it rated the film as one of the "Best 1000" of all time.

After attending the premiere, the commander of the Strategic Air Command, General Curtis LeMay, told the authors that he "couldn't find anything wrong with it." It was required viewing at all the U.S. service academies, college/university Air Force Reserve Officer Training Corps detachments, Air Force Officer Training Schools, the U.S. Navy's former Aviation Officer Candidate School, and the Coast Guard Officer Candidate School, where it was used as a teaching example for the situational leadership theory, although not currently used by the USAF. The film is also widely used in both the military and civilian worlds to teach the principles of leadership.

Michael Gebert declares it the best film of 1949. and Christopher Tookey writes, it is "probably the best picture about the pressures which war imposes on those at the top."

In its initial release, the film took in $3,225,000 in rentals in the U.S. alone.

Awards and honors
Twelve O'Clock High won Academy Awards for Best Actor in a Supporting Role for Dean Jagger and Best Sound Recording. It was nominated for Best Actor in a Leading Role for Gregory Peck and Best Picture. In addition, Peck received the New York Film Critics Circle Award for Best Actor, and the film was nominated for Best Picture by the National Board of Review.

In 1998, the film was selected for preservation in the United States National Film Registry by the Library of Congress as being "culturally, historically, or aesthetically significant".

AFI's 100 Years... 100 Heroes and Villains
Brigadier General Frank Savage – Nominated Hero

Meaning of the title

The term "twelve o'clock high" refers to the practice of calling out the positions of attacking enemy aircraft by reference to an imaginary clock face, with the bomber at the center. The terms "high" (above the bomber), "level" (at the same altitude as the bomber) and "low" (below the bomber) further refine the location of the enemy. Thus "twelve o'clock high" meant the attacker was approaching from directly ahead and above. This location was preferred by German fighter pilots because, until the introduction of the Bendix chin turret in the B-17G model, the nose of the B-17 was the most lightly armed and vulnerable part of the bomber. Enemy fighter aircraft diving from above were also more difficult targets for the B-17 gunners due to their high closing speeds.

Bartlett's wife, actress Ellen Drew, named the story after hearing Bartlett and Lay discuss German fighter tactics, which usually involved head-on attacks from "twelve o'clock high".

Radio and television

Gregory Peck repeated his role as General Savage on a Screen Guild Players radio broadcast on September 7, 1950.

Twelve O'Clock High later became a television series of the same name that premiered on the ABC network in 1964 and ran for three seasons. Robert Lansing played General Savage. At the end of the first season, Lansing was replaced by Paul Burke, who played Colonel Joseph Anson "Joe" Gallagher, a character loosely based on Ben Gately from the novel. Much of the combat footage seen in the film was reused in the television series.

Many of the television show's ground scenes were filmed at the Chino, California, airport, which had been used for training Army pilots during the war, and where a replica of a control tower, typical of the type seen at an 8th Air Force airfield in England, was built. The airfield itself was used in the immediate postwar period as a dump for soon-to-be-scrapped fighters and bombers, and was used for the penultimate scene in The Best Years of Our Lives when Dana Andrews relives his wartime experiences and goes on to rebuild his life.

References 
Informational notes

Citations

Further reading

 Army Air Forces Aid Society. The Official Guide to the Army Air Forces. New York: Simon & Schuster, 1944.
 Caidin, Martin. Black Thursday. New York: E.P. Dutton & Co., Inc., 1960. .
 Caidin, Martin. Everything But the Flak. New York: Duell, Sloan and Pearce, 1964.
 Caidin, Martin. Flying Forts: The B-17 in World War II. New York: Meredith Press, 1968.
 Dolan, Edward F. Jr. Hollywood Goes to War. London: Bison Books, 1985. .
 Hardwick, Jack and Ed Schnepf. "A Viewer's Guide to Aviation Movies." The Making of the Great Aviation Films. General Aviation Series, Volume 2, 1989.
 Kerrigan, Evans E. American War Medals and Decorations. New York: Viking Press, 1964. .
 Lay, Beirne Jr. and Sy Bartlett.  12 O'Clock High. New York: Harper & Brothers, 1948 (Reprint 1989). .
 "Medal of Honor Recipients, World War II (M-S)."  United States Army Center of Military History.
 Murphy, Edward F. Heroes of WWII. Novato, California: Presidio Press, 1990. .
 Rubin, Steven Jay. "Chapter 3, Twelve O'clock High." Combat Films: American Realism, 1945–2010. Jefferson, North Carolina: McFarland and Co., 2011.

External links
 Twelve O’Clock High essay by Luisa F. Ribeiro at National Film Registry
 Twelve O’Clock High essay by Daniel Eagan in America's Film Legacy: The Authoritative Guide to the Landmark Movies in the National Film Registry, A&C Black, 2010 , pp. 431–432

 
 
 
 

1949 films
1949 war films
American war films
American aviation films
American black-and-white films
1940s English-language films
World War II aviation films
World War II films based on actual events
Films about the United States Army Air Forces
Films adapted into television shows
Boeing B-17 Flying Fortress
Films based on American novels
Films featuring a Best Supporting Actor Academy Award-winning performance
Films that won the Best Sound Mixing Academy Award
20th Century Fox films
Films directed by Henry King
Films produced by Darryl F. Zanuck
Films scored by Alfred Newman
United States National Film Registry films
1940s American films